James Metcalfe may refer to:

 James Metcalfe (Bedford MP) (fl. 1715–1730), British politician
 James Metcalfe (York East MP) (1822–1886), Canadian businessman and MP for York East
 James Henry Metcalfe (1848–1925), Canadian businessman and MP for Kingston
 James B. Metcalfe (1846–1924), American lawyer and political figure
 James Metcalfe (rugby) (1873–1943), English rugby union and rugby league footballer
 James J. Metcalfe (1906–1960), American poet
 James Metcalfe (Bengal Army officer) (1817–1888), Anglo-Indian military officer in the Bengal Army

See also 
 James Medcalf (1895–1980), English footballer
 James Metcalf (disambiguation), including Jim Metcalf